Calvin Township may refer to:

Calvin Township, Jewell County, Kansas
Calvin Township, Michigan
Calvin, Ontario, Canada, a township